The 2003 USA Outdoor Track and Field Championships was organised by USA Track & Field and held from June 19 to 22 at the Cobb Track & Angell Field in Palo Alto, California. The four-day competition served as the national championships in track and field for the United States and also the trials for the 2003 World Championships in Athletics.

It was the second consecutive time that the stadium in Palo Alto had held the combined gender national track and field event. The Cobb Track & Angell Field, connected to Stanford University, was the host of the annual Payton Jordan U.S. Open – a high-profile mixed senior and college level meet. The USA Junior Championships were held in conjunction with the event and the events served as selection for the 2003 Pan American Junior Athletics Championships. Senior performances also informed the team selection for the athletics sections of the 2003 Pan American Games and 2003 Summer Universiade.

Gail Devers had a fifth consecutive win in the women's 100 m hurdles, bringing her career total to nine national hurdles titles. Stacy Dragila also had her fifth straight win, bringing her total to seven titles. Marla Runyan won her third straight title in the 5000 m, while David Krummenacker achieved the same feat in the men's 800 m. Hurdler Allen Johnson extended his unbeaten streak to four titles, bringing him to a career sum of six. Breaux Greer won his fourth title to remain unbeaten in the men's javelin since 2000.

There was extensive doping at the competition, with national champions Kelli White (100 m and 200 m), Regina Jacobs (1500 m), Eric Thomas (400 m hurdles), Kevin Toth (shot put), and Melissa Price (hammer) all subsequently having their national titles removed from the record. Then-world record holder Tim Montgomery was also later disqualified, having finished as men's 100 m runner-up. The men's 400 m runner-up Calvin Harrison and women's 400 m hurdles third placer Sandra Glover had their performances annulled due to doping as well.

Results
Key:

Men track events

Men field events

 Tim Montgomery was originally runner-up in the men's 100 m, but was disqualified due to doping. Jon Drummond and Coby Miller were raised to second and third place.
 Calvin Harrison was originally runner-up in the men's 400 m, but was disqualified due to doping. Jerome Young and Derrick Brew were raised to second and third place.
 Eric Thomas originally won the men's 400 m hurdles, but was disqualified due to doping. Bershawn Jackson was elevated to the national title. Joey Woody and James Carter were raised to second and third place.
 Kevin Toth originally won the men's shot put, but was disqualified due to doping. John Godina was elevated to the national title. Reese Hoffa and Adam Nelson were raised to second and third place.

Women track events

Women field events

 Kelli White originally won the women's 100 m, but was disqualified due to doping. Torri Edwards was elevated to the national title. Gail Devers and Inger Miller were raised to second and third place.
 Kelli White originally won the women's 200 m, but was disqualified due to doping. Torri Edwards was elevated to the national title. Allyson Felix and LaTasha Jenkins were raised to second and third place.
 Regina Jacobs originally won the women's 1500 m, but was disqualified due to doping. Suzy Favor Hamilton was elevated to the national title. Tiffany McWilliams and Collette Liss were raised to second and third place.
 Sandra Glover originally placed third in the women's 400 m hurdles, but was disqualified due to doping. Brenda Taylor was raised to third place.
 Melissa Price originally won the women's hammer throw, but was disqualified due to doping. Anna Mahon was elevated to the national title. Dawn Ellerbe and Jukina Dickerson were raised to second and third place.
 The women's steeplechase was a national championship event, but was not part of the selection for the World Championships as the women's event was not added to the competition program until the 2005 edition.

Doping

Doping was widespread at the 2003 USA Championships. A year after the competition, hurdler Brenda Taylor revealed she was offered banned substance modafinil and claimed that she thought she was "the only person that didn't take it". This followed the revelation that several athletes had tested positive for that drug at the championships and received bans from the sport, including Kelli White, Chryste Gaines, Sandra Glover and Eric Thomas and John McEwen. The governing body USA Track & Field was criticised for not acting more quickly in reporting the failed tests. Despite the failed drug test, the American body failed to report this to the International Association of Athletics Federations until after she had won gold medals in both the 100 m and 200 m at the World Championships.

Others to later have their national championship results be disqualified for doping were: Regina Jacobs, Damu Cherry, Melissa Price, Tim Montgomery, Calvin Harrison, Alvin Harrison and Kevin Toth. Many of these athlete bans were related to the BALCO scandal and the use of Tetrahydrogestrinone (THG).

World Championships qualification

Automatic byes
A total of five American athletes were eligible for automatic byes into the 2003 World Championships in Athletics as a result of their being the defending champions from the 2001 World Championships in Athletics. All the athletes used their byes.

Maurice Greene (athlete): men's 100 meters
John Godina: men's shot put
Allen Johnson: men's 110 m hurdles
Anjanette Kirkland: women's 100 m hurdles
Stacy Dragila: women's pole vault

Non-top three selections

Men's shot put fourth placer Christian Cantwell would have been given the fourth national team spot due to Godina's bye, but was omitted as Kevin Toth, whose performance was later disqualified for doping, was chosen instead.

Sam Burley, sixth in the men's 800 m, was given the third national team place as the highest finisher with the "A" qualifying standard. Chris Phillips, fourth in the men's 110 m hurdles, was selected as a result of Allen Johnson's bye. Tora Harris was given the third men's high jump spot for his fifth-place finish as he was the only other athlete with the "A" standard. Low finishers in the men's discus were selected by merit of having the standard – Nick Petrucci had come fifth while Casey Malone was ninth nationally.

None of the top three finishers in the women's 5000 m had the "A" qualifying standard so Lauren Fleshman, fourth in Palo Alto, was the United States' sole World Championships representative in the event. Women's discus third placer Seilala Sua did not reach the standard so fourth place Kris Kuehl was selected instead.

References

Results
Full Results - Open. USATF. Retrieved on 2015-07-02.
Day reports
Lee, Kirby (2003-06-20). An 'easy' 10.04 for Montgomery on Day One of the 2003 US Nationals". IAAF. Retrieved on 2015-07-02.
White shows scorching speed; Williams bests Montgomery - US Champs, Day Two. IAAF (2003-06-21). Retrieved on 2015-07-02.
Jacobs and Washington on track for repeat in Paris - USA Champs Day Three. IAAF (2003-06-22). Retrieved on 2015-07-02.
White completes double and Pappas sets 8784pts PB - final day of US Nationals. IAAF (2003-06-23). Retrieved on 2015-07-02.

External links
USA Track & Field website

USA Outdoor Track and Field Championships
USA Outdoors
Track, Outdoor
Palo Alto, California
Track and field in California
USA Outdoor Track and Field Championships